Taura is a municipality in the district of Mittelsachsen, in Saxony, Germany.

Personalities 

 Johann Esche (1682-1752), born in today's local part of Köthensdorf, German stocking manufacturer
 Max Unger (1883-1959), musicologist, Beethoven researcher

References 

Mittelsachsen